Johann Ludwig Christ (18 October 1739, in Öhringen – 19 November 1813, in Kronberg im Taunus) was a German naturalist, gardener, and pastor.

He was a specialist in the Hymenoptera. In 1791 he published Naturgeschichte, Klassifikation und Nomenklatur der Insekten vom Bienen, Wespen und Ameisengeschlecht. In 1791, he described Polistes dominula. He also studied fruit trees and wrote Vollständige Pomologie (2 volumes, 1809–1822).

See also 
 Parson-naturalist

References 

 Helmut Bode: Johann Ludwig Christ. Pfarrer, Naturforscher, Ökonom, Bienenzüchter und Pomologe 1739–1813. Frankfurt am Main 1984,

External links 
 
 

1739 births
1813 deaths
People from Öhringen
People from Kronberg im Taunus
German gardeners
German naturalists
German entomologists
18th-century agronomists
19th-century agronomists